Rembrandt is a 1999 international coproduction biographical film directed by Charles Matton.

Cast 
 Klaus Maria Brandauer - Rembrandt van Rijn
 Johanna ter Steege - Saskia Uylenburgh
 Romane Bohringer - Hendrickje Stoffels
 Jean Rochefort - Nicolaes Tulp
 Jean-Philippe Écoffey - Jan Six
 Caroline van Houten - Geertje Dircx
 Richard Bohringer - Le prêcheur
 Franck de la Personne - Hendrick Uylenburgh
 Jacques Spiesser - Joost Van den Vondel
 Caroline Silhol - Maria Tesselschade
 Nicholas Palliser - Constantijn Huygens
 François Delaive - Govert Flinck
  - Titus van Rijn
 Ludivine Sagnier - Cornelia van Rijn

References

External links 

1990s biographical films
German biographical films
French biographical films
Dutch biographical films
Films about Rembrandt
Films set in the 1630s
Films set in the 1640s
Films set in the 1650s
Films set in the 1660s
Films set in Amsterdam
Films set in the Netherlands
1990s French-language films
English-language Dutch films
English-language French films
English-language German films
1990s French films
1990s German films